Rising Star Games Limited is a British video game publisher based in Hitchin.

History 
Rising Star Games was founded on 10 July 2004 by Martin Defries as a joint venture between Bergsala Holding and Japanese publisher Marvelous Entertainment. Marvelous Entertainment sold its 50% share in Rising Star Games to Intergrow, another Japanese publisher, in January 2010. Rising Star Games opened a United States office based in California in January 2012. Thunderful acquired Rising Star Games from Bergsala Holding in July 2018, at which point Ed Valiente became its managing director and Defries left the company.

Games

References

External links 
 

2004 establishments in England
2018 mergers and acquisitions
British companies established in 2004
British subsidiaries of foreign companies
Companies based in North Hertfordshire District
Hitchin
Marvelous Entertainment
Video game companies established in 2004
Video game companies of the United Kingdom
Video game publishers